Fly is an unincorporated community in Maury County, Tennessee. It is along the Natchez Trace Parkway, south of Nashville. The small valley known as Fly Hollow is between Fly and the Natchez Trace.

In the early 19th century a number of Fly family members, mostly from North Carolina, moved to this part of Tennessee near the Natchez Trace on Leipers Creek, a tributary of the Duck River. After a rail line was built through the area the settlement was called Fly's Station. The local store is still called Fly's Store.

References

External links
 
 

Natchez Trace
Unincorporated communities in Tennessee
Unincorporated communities in Maury County, Tennessee